John Sponlee (died c. 1386) was an English Gothic architect, responsible for the Dean's Cloister at Windsor Castle (1353).

References 

14th-century English architects
Gothic architects
14th-century births
14th-century deaths